Lepidokirbyia venigera is a moth of the family Erebidae first described by Hervé de Toulgoët in 1982. It is found in French Guiana, Brazil and Mexico.

References

 

Phaegopterina
Moths described in 1982